The 1954 Alabama Crimson Tide football team (variously "Alabama", "UA" or "Bama") represented the University of Alabama in the 1954 college football season. It was the Crimson Tide's 60th overall and 21st season as a member of the Southeastern Conference (SEC). The team was led by head coach Harold Drew, in his eighth year, and played their home games at Denny Stadium in Tuscaloosa, Legion Field in Birmingham, Ladd Stadium in Mobile and at the Cramton Bowl in Montgomery, Alabama. They finished with a record of four wins, five losses and two ties (4–5–2 overall, 3–3–2 in the SEC).

However, the Crimson Tide followed their streak by scoring only 14 points over the final six games of the 1954 season. After their win over Tennessee, Alabama lost to Mississippi State, and in the loss began a streak of 16 consecutive scoreless quarters that tied the all-time school record. Consecutive scoreless ties against Georgia and Tulane followed, despite quarterback Bart Starr's attempted comeback from a brutal pre-season hazing injury. The season ended with losses to Georgia Tech, Miami and Auburn by a combined score of 71–7. Their record of 4–5–2 was only Alabama's second losing season in 50 years.

After the conclusion of the season, on December 2, Harold Drew resigned as head coach of the Crimson Tide. During his tenure as head coach, Drew had a winning record going 54–28–7 in seven years. Drew's teams won one conference title and played in three bowl games in eight years. On the day of Drew's resignation, Jennings B. Whitworth was introduced as his successor as head coach after he served in the same capacity at Oklahoma A&M.

Schedule

Game summaries

Mississippi Southern

Source:

To open the 1954 season, Alabama was upset by the Mississippi Southern Southerners, for the second consecutive year, 7–2 at the Cramton Bowl on a Friday night. The only touchdown of the game was scored by the Golden Eagles in the first quarter on an 18-yard Brooks Tisdale touchdown run. For the remainder of the game, both defenses were dominate with the only points coming in the fourth quarter when Douglas Potts blocked a Southern punt into the end zone for a safety and made the final score 7–2. The loss brought Alabama's all-time record against Mississippi Southern to 6–2.

LSU

Source:

To open conference play for the 1954 season, Alabama defeated LSU 12–0 at Tiger Stadium in Baton Rouge. After a scoreless first quarter, Alabama scored their first touchdown on a 15-yard Bart Starr pass to Thomas Tharp for a 6–0 halftime lead. On the first play of the final period, Hootie Ingram scored on a 69-yard run and made the final score 12–0. The victory improved Alabama's all-time record against LSU to 15–6–4.

Vanderbilt

Source:

At Ladd Stadium, the Crimson Tide defeated the Vanderbilt Commodores by a final score of 28–14 in Mobile. Vanderbilt took a 7–0 first quarter lead after Charley Horton scored on a five-yard touchdown run. The Crimson Tide responded with a 30-yard Hootie Ingram touchdown pass to Thomas Tharp to tie the game 7–7 in the second quarter. However, the Commodores responded to take a 14–7 halftime lead after 28-yard Horton touchdown run. Early in the third, a blocked Vandy punt gave Alabama possession at the Commodores 16-yard line. Four plays later, William Stone tied the game at 14–14 with his two-yard touchdown run. Alabama then closed with a pair of touchdowns to win the game 28–14. In the third, Albert Elmore threw a seven-yard touchdown pass to Bobby Luna and in the fourth, Tharp scored on a 10-yard run. The victory improved Alabama's all-time record against Vanderbilt to 18–14–1.

Tulsa

Source:

In the first Denny Stadium game of the season, Alabama shutout the Tulsa Golden Hurricane 40–0 in a contest that saw the Crimson Tide throw five touchdown passes. Alabama took a 14–0 first quarter lead after a 22-yard Hootie Ingram pass to William Hollis and on a 26-yard Ollie Yates pass to Curtis Lynch. Another pair of touchdowns in the second quarter on a four-yard Jerry Watford run and an 18-yard Yates pass to Billy Lumpkin made the halftime score 26–0 in favor of the Crimson Tide. Alabama then closed their scoring with a pair of third-quarter touchdowns on a 17-yard Albert Elmore pass to Paul Donaldson and finally on an 88-yard Elmore pass to Bobby Luna that made the final score 40–0. The victory improved Alabama's all-time record against Tulsa to 2–0.

Tennessee

Sources:

In their annual rivalry game against the Tennessee, Alabama shutout the Volunteers 27–0 and handed the Vols their worst home loss to date. After a scoreless first quarter, Alabama took a 7–0 halftime lead after Albert Elmore threw an 11-yard touchdown pass to Bobby Luna late in the second quarter. A pair of Elmore touchdown passes in the third quarter, seven-yards to Thomas Tharp and 25-yards to Nicholas Germanos, extended the Crimson Tide lead to 21–0. The final points came late in the fourth quarter when Tharp returned an interception 96-yards for touchdown and the 27–0 victory. The return remained the longest in Alabama history through the 1991 season when Mark McMillian had a 98-yard return against . The victory improved Alabama's all-time record against Tennessee to 18–13–5.

Mississippi State

Source:

On homecoming in Tuscaloosa, the Crimson Tide were defeated by the Mississippi State Maroons 12–7 at Denny Stadium. After a scoreless first quarter, Alabama took a 7–0 halftime lead when Albert Elmore threw a three-yard touchdown pass to Thomas Tharp with only 0:25 left in the second. The Maroons scored their first touchdown in the third quarter when Bobby Collins returned a Bobby Luna punt 56-yards to cut the Crimson Tide lead to 7–6. State then scored the game-winning touchdown on a 30-yard Joe Silveri run in the fourth and gave the Maroons the 12–7 victory. The loss brought Alabama's all-time record against Mississippi State to 28–8–3.

Georgia

Sources:

At Birmingham, the Crimson Tide battled the Georgia Bulldogs to a scoreless tie in the first Legion Field game of the season. The tie brought Alabama's all-time record against Georgia to 21–15–4.

Tulane

Source:

For their game against Tulane, Alabama traveled to New Orleans and played the Green Wave to a scoreless tie, the second for the Crimson Tide in two weeks.  The tie brought Alabama's all-time record against Tulane to 16–7–2.

Georgia Tech

Source:

Against Georgia Tech, Alabama extended their scoreless streak to 14 quarters before a nationally televised audience against the Yellow Jackets 20–0 at Grant Field. Tech took a commanding 13–0 lead in the first quarter with touchdowns scored on runs of 45-yards by Paul Rotenberry and seven-yards by E. O. Thompson. The Jackets then scored their final points in the third on a six-yard Thompson run for the 20–0 victory. The loss brought Alabama's all-time record against Georgia Tech to 18–15–3.

Miami

Source:

On a Friday evening in Miami, Alabama was defeated by the Miami Hurricanes 23–7 at Burdine Stadium. After a scoreless first, Miami took a 10–0 halftime lead after Porky Oliver kicked a field goal and on a six-yard Whitey Rouviere touchdown run in the second quarter. The Crimson Tide then ended a 16 quarter shutout streak in the third quarter when Bart Starr scored on a one-yard run and made the score 10–7. The Hurricanes then closed the game with a pair of fourth-quarter touchdowns and won the game 23–7. The loss brought Alabama's all-time record against Miami to 3–1.

Auburn

Sources:

For the first time since the 1949 season, Alabama was defeated by the rival Auburn Tigers 28–0 at Legion Field. Auburn led 7–0 at halftime with the only first half touchdown scored on a one-yard Bobby Freeman run in the first quarter. After a 41-yard Freeman run gave the Tigers a 14–0 lead in the third, a pair of fourth-quarter touchdowns gave Auburn the 28–0 victory. The final points came on a one-yard Joe Childress run and a three-yard Freeman run. The loss brought Alabama's all-time record against Auburn to 9–9–1.

Personnel

Varsity letter winners

Coaching staff

References
General

 

Specific

Alabama
Alabama Crimson Tide football seasons
Alabama Crimson Tide football